Linda Carroll Hamilton (born September 26, 1956) is an American actress. She played Sarah Connor in the Terminator film series and Catherine Chandler in the television series Beauty and the Beast (1987–1990), for which she was nominated for two Golden Globe Awards and an Emmy Award. She also starred as Vicky Baxter in the horror film Children of the Corn (1984), Doctor Amy Franklin in the monster film King Kong Lives (1986), and Mayor Rachel Wando in the disaster thriller film Dante's Peak (1997). She had a recurring role as Mary Elizabeth Bartowski in NBC's Chuck.

Early life
Hamilton was born in Salisbury, Maryland, on September 26, 1956. Hamilton's father died when she was five, and her mother later married a police chief. Hamilton had an identical twin sister, Leslie Hamilton Freas (1956–2020), one older sister and one younger brother. She has said that she was raised in a very "boring" family, and "voraciously read books" during her spare time. Hamilton went to Wicomico Junior High (now Wicomico Middle School) and Wicomico High School in Salisbury, with Leslie, her twin. She studied for two years at Washington College in Chestertown, Maryland, before moving on to acting studies in New York City. Hamilton has said that her acting professor at Washington College told her she had no hope of earning a living as an actress. In New York, she attended acting workshops given by Lee Strasberg.

Career

Hamilton's first major role on screen was as Lisa Rogers in the prime-time soap opera Secrets of Midland Heights (December 1980/January 1981). Her big-screen debut was in the thriller TAG: The Assassination Game (1982) and, as a result, she was listed as one of twelve "Promising New Actors of 1982" in John A. Willis' Screen World, Vol. 34. She also starred in the CBS made-for-TV film Country Gold alongside Loni Anderson and Earl Holliman.

Hamilton co-starred with Peter Horton as the adult leads in Children of the Corn (1984), based on the horror short story by Stephen King. The low budget film was commercially successful, making $14 million at the box office, but was panned by critics. Hamilton's next role was as Sarah Connor in The Terminator (1984), opposite Michael Biehn. The film was an unexpected commercial success, topping the US box office for two weeks. Following The Terminator, Hamilton starred in Black Moon Rising (1986), an action thriller with Tommy Lee Jones. She then returned to television as a guest star in the mystery series Murder, She Wrote, receiving favorable reviews. Hamilton next starred opposite Ron Perlman in the television series Beauty and the Beast. The series was critically acclaimed, and she received Emmy Award and Golden Globe Award nominations. Hamilton left the series in 1989 and it ended in 1990.

Hamilton returned to the big screen with Jim Belushi in Mr. Destiny (1990) and reprised her role as Sarah Connor in Terminator 2: Judgment Day (1991), the sequel to The Terminator. The latter was a smash at the box office, grossing over $500 million, more than any other film of that year. Hamilton underwent intense physical training to emphasize the character's transformation from the first film. Her identical twin sister, Leslie Hamilton, was her double in Terminator 2. Hamilton received MTV Movie Awards for her role in the film for Best Female Performance and Most Desirable Female. She reprised the character for the theme park attraction T2 3-D. Following the success of the Terminator series, she hosted Saturday Night Live.

She returned to television in A Mother's Prayer (1995) playing a mother who lost her husband and is diagnosed with AIDS. For her performance in the film, which co-starred Kate Nelligan and Bruce Dern, Hamilton was awarded a CableACE Award for best dramatic performance and nominated for another Golden Globe Award in 1996. That same year, Hamilton filmed two motion pictures that were released one week apart in 1997: Shadow Conspiracy with Charlie Sheen and Dante's Peak with Pierce Brosnan. Shadow Conspiracy flopped at the box office, but Dante's Peak grossed $180 million and was one of the biggest commercial hits of the year. She received a Blockbuster Entertainment Award for female performance in Dante's Peak.

Hamilton has since appeared on the television series Frasier (season 4 episode "Odd Man Out" as Laura) and According to Jim and has done more TV movies, including On the Line, Robots Rising, Rescuers: Stories of Courage: Two Couples, Point Last Seen and The Color of Courage. Hamilton and her Beauty and the Beast co-star Ron Perlman reunited in the post-Vietnam war drama Missing in America (2005).

In 2009, she returned as Sarah Connor in Terminator Salvation, in voice-overs only. In 2010, she joined the cast of Chuck in the recurring guest role of Mary Elizabeth Bartowski, a CIA agent and long-missing mother of Chuck and Ellie. She also appeared as a guest star in the Showtime cable television series Weeds as the marijuana supplier for the series' main character (Mary-Louise Parker). In November 2011, she narrated the Chiller The Future of Fear horror documentary.

In 2013, Hamilton appeared as Acacia, a Valkyrie, in "Delinquents", a third-season episode of the TV series Lost Girl, a role she would reprise in two subsequent episodes, "End of a Line" in the fourth season, and "Sweet Valkyrie High" in the fifth. She subsequently appeared in a recurring role on the Syfy series Defiance, beginning in that show's second season. In 2019, she reprised her role as Sarah Connor in Terminator: Dark Fate, her first starring role as the character since 1991, and also voiced the character in the video game Gears 5.

Personal life
Hamilton has been married and divorced twice. Her first marriage, from 1982 to 1989, was to Bruce Abbott, who left her when she was pregnant with their son, born in 1989. Linda stated it was because of the way she treated him during their marriage and made a public apology to him in 2004. In 1991, she moved in with film director James Cameron. They had a daughter, born in 1993. She and Cameron married in 1997; this ended in a $50 million divorce settlement in 1999.

Hamilton has described herself politically as a Democrat, but she voted for Republican candidate Arnold Schwarzenegger, her Terminator co-star, in the 2003 California gubernatorial election after his campaign convinced her he was suitable for the job.

In an October 2005 appearance on Larry King Live, Hamilton discussed her depression and bipolar disorder, which led to violent mood swings and suicidal thoughts during her marriage to Abbott and, in her view, caused the failure of both of her marriages. She also discussed how she eventually received therapy and medication to manage the condition.

While filming Terminator 2: Judgment Day, Hamilton suffered permanent hearing damage in one ear when Schwarzenegger fired a shotgun inside an elevator after she had removed her ear plugs.

Hamilton's twin sister, Leslie, died on August 22, 2020, at the age of 63.

Filmography

Awards and nominations

References

External links

 
 
 
 2006 Linda Hamilton Interview on Sidewalks Entertainment
 Linda Hamilton interview with Larry King

1956 births
20th-century American actresses
21st-century American actresses
Actresses from Maryland
American film actresses
American television actresses
American voice actresses
Identical twin actresses
Lee Strasberg Theatre and Film Institute alumni
Living people
Maryland Democrats
People from Salisbury, Maryland
People with bipolar disorder
American twins
Washington College alumni